Thiemo de Bakker was the defending champion, but did not participate.

Seeds

Draw

Finals

Top half

Bottom half

References
 Main Draw
 Qualifying Draw

Challenger ATP Cachantún Cup -Singles
2015 - Singles